The black slimehead (Hoplostethus cadenati) is a member of the order Beryciformes. It is found along the coast of northwest Africa from Cape Verde down to South Africa.

References

External links
 

black slimehead
Fish of the East Atlantic
Marine fauna of West Africa
Marine fish of South Africa
black slimehead